Ctenosaura nolascensis, the Nolasco spiny-tailed iguana or San Pedro Nolasco spinytail iguana, is a species of iguana native to Mexico. It is endemic to one island, the Isla San Pedro Nolasco.

References 

Endemic reptiles of Mexico
Fauna of Gulf of California islands
Reptiles described in 1972
Ctenosaura
Taxa named by Hobart Muir Smith